"Sea of Voices" is a song recorded by American electronic music producer Porter Robinson. It was released on March 3, 2014 as the first single from his debut studio album Worlds (2014). The track revealed the tone of Worlds as emotional and nostalgic, as opposed to his older complextro dance music style. The song features uncredited vocals from Breanne Düren. The song was a hit on the American Dance/Electronic Songs chart.

Composition

Robinson has stated that "Sea of Voices" is one of his favorite tracks on the album in addition to "Divinity", "Goodbye to a World", "Sad Machine", "Fellow Feeling", and "Flicker". He has stated that "Sea of Voices" went through many versions, including a version where he used the Vocaloid voice, Avanna, to provide the vocal.

Release and promotion
"Sea of Voices" was the first single that was released from Worlds, in March 2014. Robinson stated that Astralwerks, the record label he is signed under, wanted to release the EDM-fueled "Shepherdess" as the first single, but Robinson declined.  He wanted to do the exact opposite, and release the track that reminded him the least of dance music. He decided to release "Sea of Voices" first, to inspire conversation among his fans about his change in style, and released "Shepherdess" as the bonus track on the vinyl version of his album.

The song peaked at number 28 on the Billboard Dance/Electronic Songs chart in the United States on the issue week of March 22, 2014.

A remix by RAC was released on March 18, 2014. Another remix by Galimatias was released as a single off of Robinson's debut remix album Worlds Remixed on September 18, 2015. An official audio video for "Sea of Voices" premiered on August 14, 2014 on Robinson's YouTube channel.

Critical reception
"Sea of Voices" was very well received by critics. Elissa Stolman praised Robinson on the track by saying "This was the first track I heard from Worlds, and it blew me away. I've blabbed about it to my snob friends and gushed about how he's crafted the first ambient EDM track I've ever heard. A beat kicks in later, but the first few minutes pit slow-moving big room synths against ... nothing. No drums." In his mixed review of Worlds, Derek Staples of Consequence of Sound stated that "Sea of Voices" was "a few months too late for inclusion on the Divergent soundtrack." Allmusic journalist Andy Kellman said of "Sea of Voices" that, "For over three minutes, it's nothing but softly swelling strings, wind chimes, and Breanne Düren's distantly cooing voice, and then a trudging beat enters and disappears in time for Düren to sing, lullaby-like, something vague about the world falling apart."

Charts

Release history

References

2014 singles
2014 songs
Porter Robinson songs
Song recordings produced by Porter Robinson
Songs written by Porter Robinson